Charles Murdoch may refer to:

Charles Murdoch (footballer), Scottish footballer
Charles Murdoch (trade unionist) (1902–1962), Scottish trade union leader
 Charles Murdoch (record producer), Australian record producer and musician
 Charles Townshend Murdoch (1837–1898), English banker and politician